Hockey Club Tornado Moscow Region, often shortened to HC Tornado, Tornado Moscow Region or Tornado Dmitrov, is an ice hockey club in the Zhenskaya Hockey League (ZhHL). The team is based in Dmitrov, Moscow Oblast, Russia, and they play at the ice palace of the Dmitrov Sport Complex, abbreviated as SC Dmitrov. Tornado is a nine-time Russian Champion and won the European Women's Champions Cup four times.

History 
HC Tornado has been a top competitor in the women's ice hockey Russian Championship since the club's inaugural season in 2003–04. During its first fifteen seasons, Tornado was the dominant force in the Russian Women's Hockey League, winning seven national titles and never finishing below second place. They medaled at five IIHF European Women's Champions Cup (EWCC) tournaments, winning the cup in 2010, 2012, 2013, and 2014, and claiming silver in 2006; Tornado is tied with AIK Hockey Dam for most EWCC titles held by a single team. During the same period, Tornado also won three Challenge Cups and four Czech Women's Cups.

In the 2018–19 season Tornado ranked fifth in the regular season, failing to qualify for the playoffs for the first time in team history. The poor performance was attributed to the absence of several key players, such as Lyudmila Belyakova and Angelina Goncharenko, who were on maternity leave, and the departure of Maria Batalova to Agidel Ufa.

The team returned to the top half of the ZhHL in the 2019–20 season, bolstered by the return of both Belyakova and Goncharenko. Tornado finished the regular season as the second ranked Russian team but the newcomers to the league, China-based Shenzhen KRS Vanke Rays, upset the ZhHL's traditional order, blazing to the top of the ranks and pushing each of the Russian teams down a peg. As a result, Tornado finished the regular season as the third-ranked team overall and faced the first-ranked Vanke Rays in the playoff semifinals, where they were swept by the eventual champions.

Season-by-season results 
This is a partial list of recent seasons completed by HC Tornado.

Note: Finish = Rank at end of regular season; GP = Games played; W = Wins (3 points); OTW = Overtime wins (2 points); OTL = Overtime losses (1 point); L = Losses (0 points); GF = Goals for; GA = Goals against; Pts = Points

Source:

Players and personnel

2021–22 roster 

Coaching staff and team personnel
 Head coach: Alexei Chistyakov
 Assistant coach: Alexei Zherebtsov
 Goaltending coach: Sergei Kostyukhin
 Team manager: Pavel Pevchev
 Doctor: Yuri Smirnov
 Masseur: Vera Andreeva

Team captains 
 Yekaterina Smolentseva, 2009–10
 Olga Permyakova, 2011–2015
 Anna Shokhina, 2015–present

Head coaches 
 Alexei Chistyakov, 2009–present

General managers
 Olga Votolovskaya, 2007–2014
 Mikhail Cherkovsky, 2017–18
 Sergei Konovalov, 2018–present

Team honors

Russian Championship 

  Russian Champion (9):
 Russian Women's Hockey League: 2006, 2007, 2009, 2011, 2012, 2013, 2015
 Zhenskaya Hockey League: 2016, 2017
  Runners-up (6):
 Russian Women's Hockey League: 2004, 2005, 2008, 2010, 2014
 Zhenskaya Hockey League: 2018
  Third Place (1):
 Zhenskaya Hockey League: 2020

IIHF European Women's Champions Cup

  European Women's Champions Cup (4): 2010, 2012, 2013, 2014
  Runners-up (1): 2006

Other 

  Challenge Cup (3): 2004, 2005, 2006 
  Czech Women's Cup (4): 2010, 2011, 2012, 2013

Sources:

Franchise records and leaders 
Records valid through the conclusion of the 2020–21 ZhHL season.

Single-season records
For statistics measured by percentage or average, skaters playing in less than 80% of games and goaltenders playing in fewer than 10 games in a season not included.
Most goals in a season: Yekaterina Smolentseva, 102 goals (48 games; 2012–13)
Most assists in a season: Yekaterina Smolentseva, 84 assists (48 games; 2012–13)
Most points in a season: Yekaterina Smolentseva, 186 points (48 games; 2012–13)
Most points in a season, defenceman: Inna Dyubanok, 100 points (48 games; 2012–13)
Most points per game (P/G) in a season: Yekaterina Smolentseva, 3.88 P/G (48 games; 2012–13)

Most penalty minutes (PIM) in a season: Tatiana Burina, 106 PIM (45 games; 2012–13)
Best save percentage (SVS%) in a season: Yelizaveta Kondakova, .928 SVS% (12 games; 2016–17)
Best goals against average (GAA) in a season: Valentina Ostrovlyanchik, 1.25 GAA (24 games; 2014–15)
Source:

Career records 
Most career goals: Anna Shokhina, 273 goals (262 games; 2012–2021)
Most career assists: Anna Shokhina, 304 assists (262 games; 2012–2021)
Most career points: Anna Shokhina, 577 points (262 games; 2012–2021)
Most career points, defenceman: Nina Pirogova, 210 (222 games; 2013–2021)
Most career points per game (P/G): Yekaterina Smolentseva, 3.20 P/G (80 games; 2009–2014)
Most career penalty minutes: Tatiana Burina, 302 PIM (2009–2017)
Most games played, skater: Anna Shokhina, 297 games (2012–present)
Most games played, goaltender: Anna Prugova, 116 games (2009–2015)

All-time scoring leaders

The top ten point-scorers of HC Tornado.

Note: Nat = Nationality; Pos = Position; GP = Games played; G = Goals; A = Assists; Pts = Points; P/G = Points per game;  = 2021–22 HC Tornado player; Bold indicates team record

Sources:

Notable alumni

National team participation 
Tornado players have historically represented a significant contingent of the Russian national ice hockey team rosters at the IIHF World Women's Championship and Winter Olympic Games.

The 21-woman roster selected to represent Russia in the women's ice hockey tournament at the 2014 Winter Olympics included nine HC Tornado players. In December 2017, eight Russian team players were disqualified from the tournament and banned for life from Olympic participation for doping violations. Four of the implicated players were with HC Tornado at the time of the games, forwards Ekaterina Smolentseva, Galina Skiba, and Tatiana Burina, and defenceman Anna Shukina. Sanctions were later annulled for Smolentseva, Burina, and Shukina. The disqualification of Skiba and two other Russian players was upheld, as was the suspension of the Russian Olympic Committee by the International Olympic Committee (IIHF). The Ice Hockey Federation of Russia did not sanction any of the eight players involved and their totals from the 2013–14 RWHL season remain on record.

Russia was banned from competing in the 2018 Winter Olympics by the IOC as part of the Oswald Commission rulings regarding state-sponsored doping. However, Russian athletes were permitted to compete under the designation Olympic Athletes from Russia. In practical terms, this was largely performative as the Olympic Athletes from Russia (OAR) women's ice hockey team roster was nearly identical to the Russian national team roster that competed at the 2017 IIHF Women's World Championship. The team was coached by long-time HC Tornado head coach Alexei Vladimirovich Chistyakov and included ten Tornado players. Tornado players Maria Batalova and Yelena Dergachyova served as the team's two alternate captains and HC Tornado captain Anna Shokhina was the team's top scorer in the tournament. OAR lost the bronze medal game against Finland and finished in fourth place.

Russian alumni 
Season(s) active with HC Tornado listed alongside player name.
Nadezhda Alexandrova, 2015–2019
Maria Batalova, 2014–2018
Lyudmila Belyakova, 2014–15, 2016–2018 & 2019–20
Tatiana Burina, 2009–2017
Yelena Dergachyova, 2014–2019
Yekaterina Dil, 2003–04
Inna Dyubanok, 2009–2013
Iya Gavrilova, 2013–14
Angelina Goncharenko, 2014–2018
Olga Permyakova, 2009–2015
Kristina Petrovskaia, 2009–2013
Alevtina Polunina, 2013–2020
Zoya Polunina, 2009–2014
Anna Prugova, 2009–2015
Marina Sergina, 2009–2014
Anna Shukina, 2011–2015
Yekaterina Smolentseva, 2009–2014
Yekaterina Smolina, 2009–2015
Alyona Starovoitova, 2016–2020
Svetlana Tkacheva, 2011–2015 & 2017–18
Svetlana Trefilova, 2003–04

International players 
The number of expatriates who have played with HC Tornado is fairly small compared to its Russian alumni. However, most of the team's international players have been members of their countries’ national teams, including players from the IIHF Top Division national teams of Canada, Slovakia, Sweden, and the United States.

Note: Flag indicates nation of primary IIHF eligibility. 

  Correne Bredin, 2008–2010
 Cherie Hendrickson, 2013–14
  Elin Holmlöv, 2011–2013
 Melissa Jaques, 2011–12
  Jana Kapustová, 2008–2013
  Iveta Koka, 2009–10
  Kim Martin Hasson, 2011–12
  Petra Pravlíková, 2009–10
  Danijela Rundqvist, 2011–12
 Brittany Simpson, 2013–14
  Mariya Skvortsova, 2009–10
  Kelley Steadman, 2013–14
  Zuzana Tomčíková, 2012–2014

Sources:

References 
This article includes content translated from the existing Russian Wikipedia article at :ru:Торнадо (хоккейный клуб); see its history for attribution.
Notes:

External links 
 Team information and statistics from Elite Prospects and EuroHockey.com and HockeyArchives.info (in French)
 

 
Zhenskaya Hockey League teams
Ice hockey in Moscow Oblast